The 2020–21 NBL season was the 2nd season for the South East Melbourne Phoenix in the NBL.

Roster

Squad

Pre-season

Ladder

Game log 

|-style="background:#fcc;"
| 1
| 18 December
| @ Brisbane
| L 108–98
| Mitch Creek (31)
| Mitch Creek (7)
| Mitch Creek (4)
| Gold Coast Sports and Leisure Centre1,120
| 0–1
|-style="background:#fcc;"
| 2
| 20 December
| @ Brisbane
| L 102–100
| Mitch Creek (29)
| Mitch Creek (10)
| Kyle Adnam (6)
| Gold Coast Sports and Leisure Centrenot announced
| 0–2

Regular season

Ladder

Game log 

|-style="background:#fcc;"
| 1
| 17 January
| @ Adelaide
| L 116–108 (2OT)
| Mitch Creek (30)
| Yanni Wetzell (11)
| Keifer Sykes (11)
| Adelaide Entertainment Centre6,518
| 0–1
|-style="background:#cfc;"
| 2
| 20 January
| @ Adelaide
| W 83–89
| Keifer Sykes (24)
| Ben Moore (13)
| Keifer Sykes (8)
| Adelaide Entertainment Centre6,946
| 1–1
|-style="background:#fcc;"
| 3
| 24 January
| @ Perth
| L 88–76
| Mitch Creek (17)
| Yanni Wetzell (11)
| Keifer Sykes (5)
| RAC Arena7,150
| 1–2
|-style="background:#cfc;"
| 4
| 29 January
| @ Perth
| W 89–90
| Mitch Creek (24)
| Creek, Moore (7)
| Keifer Sykes (9)
| RAC Arena7,150
| 2–2
|-style="background:#fcc;"
| 5
| 31 January
| @ Melbourne
| L 96–90
| Keifer Sykes (24)
| Ben Moore (10)
| Creek, Sykes (7)
| Bendigo Stadium2,000
| 2–3

|-style="background:#cfc;"
| 6
| 7 February
| The Hawks
| W 98–82
| Adnam, Creek, Gliddon, Moore, Sykes (15)
| Ben Moore (14)
| Keifer Sykes (7)
| State Basketball Centre2,175
| 3–3
|-style="background:#fcc;"
| 7
| 11 February
| Perth
| L 75–106
| Kyle Adnam (24)
| Mitch Creek (11)
| Kyle Adnam (3)
| State Basketball Centre1,875
| 3–4
|-style="background:#cfc;"
| 8
| 14 February
| Perth
| W 96–71
| Keifer Sykes (24)
| Yanni Wetzell (10)
| Keifer Sykes (7)
| State Basketball Centreclosed event
| 4–4

|-style="background:#cfc;"
| 9
| 21 February
| Brisbane
| W 99–83
| Mitch Creek (29)
| Keifer Sykes (10)
| Keifer Sykes (11)
| John Cain Arena2,566
| 5–4
|-style="background:#fcc;"
| 10
| 23 February
| @ Adelaide
| L 99–94
| Mitch Creek (23)
| Mitch Creek (12)
| Mitch Creek (8)
| John Cain Arena1,079
| 5–5
|-style="background:#cfc;"
| 11
| 28 February
| Illawarra
| W 93–76
| Mitch Creek (25)
| Mitch Creek (6)
| Kyle Adnam (11)
| John Cain Arena3,195
| 6–5
|-style="background:#fcc;"
| 12
| 3 March
| @ Perth
| L 93–92
| Kyle Adnam (28)
| Mitch Creek (8)
| Mitch Creek (8)
| State Basketball Centre2,257
| 6–6
|-style="background:#fcc;"
| 13
| 6 March
| Sydney
| L 85–91
| Mitch Creek (22)
| Mitch Creek (9)
| Kyle Adnam (4)
| John Cain Arena3,708
| 6–7
|-style="background:#cfc;"
| 14
| 10 March
| Melbourne
| W 97–92
| Mitch Creek (31)
| Mitch Creek (10)
| Kyle Adnam (8)
| John Cain Arena3,675
| 7–7
|-style="background:#cfc;"
| 15
| 12 March
| @ Cairns
| W 81–85
| Mitch Creek (21)
| Gliddon, Wetzell (8)
| Cameron Gliddon (5)
| John Cain Arena2,478
| 8–7
|-style="background:#cfc;"
| 16
| 14 March
| @ New Zealand
| W 89–103
| Adnam, Creek (21)
| Ben Moore (5)
| Kyle Adnam (7)
| John Cain Arena4,019
| 9–7

|-style="background:#cfc;"
| 17
| 20 March
| Adelaide
| W 96–89 (OT)
| Ben Moore (23)
| Ben Moore (10)
| Ben Moore (5)
| John Cain Arena1,682
| 10–7
|-style="background:#fcc;"
| 18
| 27 March
| Melbourne
| L 60–80
| Cameron Gliddon (13)
| Ben Moore (7)
| Cameron Gliddon (4)
| John Cain Arena3,370
| 10–8

|-style="background:#cfc;"
| 19
| 2 April
| @ Illawarra
| W 63–95
| Ryan Broekhoff (26)
| Yanni Wetzell (11)
| Adnam, Gliddon, Wetzell 5
| WIN Entertainment Centre2,602
| 11–8
|-style="background:#cfc;"
| 20
| 4 April
| New Zealand
| W 92–85
| Mitch Creek (24)
| Yanni Wetzell (10)
| Kyle Adnam (7)
| John Cain Arena1,850
| 12–8
|-style="background:#fcc;"
| 21
| 9 April
| @ Illawarra
| L 82–80
| Kyle Adnam (22)
| Cameron Gliddon (8)
| Gibson, Wetzell (4)
| WIN Entertainment Centre2,533
| 12–9
|-style="background:#cfc;"
| 22
| 11 April
| @ Sydney
| W 84–98
| Mitch Creek (26)
| Ben Moore (6)
| Kyle Adnam (6)
| Qudos Bank Arena4,236
| 13–9
|-style="background:#fcc;"
| 23
| 15 April
| @ Sydney
| L 97–90
| Izayah Mauriohooho-Le'afa (29)
| Ben Moore (7)
| Keifer Sykes (5)
| Qudos Bank Arena4,476
| 13–10
|-style="background:#fcc;"
| 24
| 17 April
| Adelaide
| L 81–90
| Mitch Creek (17)
| Mitch Creek (14)
| Adnam, Gibson, Moore (3)
| John Cain Arena2,512
| 13–11
|-style="background:#fcc;"
| 25
| 22 April
| Sydney
| L 81–101
| Mitch Creek (29)
| Yanni Wetzell (6)
| Kyle Adnam (5)
| John Cain Arena1,268
| 13–12
|-style="background:#cfc;"
| 26
| 25 April
| @ Cairns
| W 66–86
| Cameron Gliddon (22)
| Mitch Creek (8)
| Izayah Mauriohooho-Le'afa (4)
| Cairns Pop-Up Arena1,905
| 14–12
|-style="background:#fcc;"
| 27
| 29 April
| Brisbane
| L 82–94
| Ben Moore (18)
| Ben Moore (7)
| Izayah Mauriohooho-Le'afa (4)
| John Cain Arena1,026
| 14–13

|-style="background:#fcc;"
| 28
| 8 May
| Melbourne
| L 82–93
| Izayah Mauriohooho-Le'afa (19)
| Yanni Wetzell (9)
| Keifer Sykes (5)
| John Cain Arena3,899
| 14–14
|-style="background:#cfc;"
| 29
| 12 May
| New Zealand
| W 91–82
| Keifer Sykes (21)
| Ben Moore (6)
| Kyle Adnam (5)
| John Cain Arena1,247
| 15–14
|-style="background:#cfc;"
| 30
| 14 May
| Cairns
| W 106–77
| Mitch Creek (20)
| Yanni Wetzell (11)
| Keifer Sykes (4)
| John Cain Arena1,711
| 16–14
|-style="background:#cfc;"
| 31
| 16 May
| @ Melbourne
| W 83–94
| Keifer Sykes (26)
| Mitch Creek (8)
| Mitch Creek (8)
| John Cain Arena3,460
| 17–14
|-style="background:#cfc;"
| 32
| 22 May
| @ Brisbane
| W 66–95
| Yanni Wetzell (18)
| Yanni Wetzell (9)
| Keifer Sykes (8)
| Nissan Arena2,533
| 18–14
|-style="background:#fcc;"
| 33
| 28 May
| Cairns
| L 87–94
| Yanni Wetzell (25)
| Yanni Wetzell (7)
| Keifer Sykes (7)
| Cairns Pop-Up Arena1,251
| 18–15

|-style="background:#fcc;"
| 34
| 2 June
| Brisbane
| L 84–91
| Mitch Creek (28)
| Mitch Creek (10)
| Keifer Sykes (8)
| Cairns Pop-Up Arenaclosed event
| 18–16
|-style="background:#cfc;"
| 35
| 5 June
| @ New Zealand
| W 78–83
| Keifer Sykes (29)
| Ryan Broekhoff (10)
| Keifer Sykes (5)
| The Trusts Arena3,872
| 19–16
|-style="background:#fcc;"
| 36
| 8 June
| @ Brisbane
| L 94–84
| Mitch Creek (17)
| Ben Moore (16)
| Kyle Adnam (6)
| Nissan Arena2,508
| 19–17

Postseason

|-style="background:#fcc;"
| 1
| 11 June
| @ Melbourne
| L 96–78
| Ben Moore (17)
| Broekhoff, Wetzell (7)
| Mitch Creek (6)
| Qudos Bank Arena500
| 0–1
|-style="background:#cfc;"
| 2
| 13 June
| Melbourne
| W 90–79
| Creek, Sykes (26)
| Yanni Wetzell (8)
| Keifer Sykes (4)
| Qudos Bank Arena500
| 1–1
|-style="background:#fcc;"
| 3
| 15 June
| @ Melbourne
| L 84–74
| Reuben Te Rangi (22)
| Mitch Creek (9)
| Keifer Sykes (4)
| Qudos Bank Arena500
| 1–2

Transactions

Re-signed

Additions

Subtractions

Awards

Player of the Week 
Round 6, Mitch Creek

Round 18, Keifer Sykes

See also 

 2020–21 NBL season
 South East Melbourne Phoenix

References

External links 

 Official Website

South East Melbourne Phoenix
South East Melbourne Phoenix seasons
South East Melbourne Phoenix season